Wolfram Berger (born 12 October 1945 in Graz) is an Austrian actor.

Selected filmography
 Assassination in Davos (1975)
 General Sutter (1999)

References

External links

1945 births
Living people
Actors from Graz
Austrian male film actors
Austrian male television actors
20th-century Austrian male actors
21st-century Austrian male actors